Buttevant GAA club is a Gaelic Athletic Association club located in the town of Buttevant, County Cork, Ireland. The club was founded in 1884 and fields teams in both Gaelic football and hurling. The club is a member of the Avondhu divisional board. The club plays under the name Awbeg Rangers for football competitions.

History
Founded in 1884 by Fr. Con Buckley (who attended the inaugural meeting of the GAA in Hayes Hotel in Thurles in the same year), Buttevant GAA has fielded teams in Hurling and Football since that time. The club has played in the former British army barracks since 1922, and officially took over the grounds from the state in the 1950s. Success on the field of play came in 1926 when the Intermediate Footballers won the Cork County Championship. The club also contested and lost the Intermediate Hurling Final in the same year. After numerous attempts, the club finally won the Cork Intermediate Hurling Final in 1940, the team was backboned by Cork's 'four in a row' All-Ireland winning fullback Batt Thornhill. Other players from the club to wear the Red and White of Cork included dual star Billy Mackessey (who won All Ireland Hurling and football in 1903 and 1911), Peter 'Hawker' O'Grady (who won an All Ireland Hurling medal in the 1930s), and Tommy O'Sullivan (who scored the winning goal in the 1952 All Ireland Hurling final and collected another All Ireland medal in 1953). Other success at adult level came in 1996 when the Hurlers won the Cork County Junior B title.

In the 1960s, the juvenile section of the club was formed and several North Cork titles were won in both codes. This included Football County Titles in U14 and U16 in the 1970s, with U16 and Minor Titles coming the club's way in the 1980s. The work done at this level continued when a separate Juvenile Club Micheal MacCarthaigh's was formed in 1994 - named after former player and soldier Michael McCarthy who lost his life on UN duty in the Lebanon in 1991. A strong Junior Team in both codes emerged in recent years, with the Hurlers winning the Club's first North Cork Junior Hurling A title in 2010 and the Junior Footballers contesting, and losing to Mitchelstown, the Club's first North Cork Junior final in 2013. The Minor A footballers got to the county final in 2013, losing to Castlehaven and then gaining this honor two years later when the side beat Macroom in October 2015.

Honours

 Cork Intermediate Hurling Championship (1): 1940  Runners-Up 1926, 1928, 1929, 1930, 1932, 1941 
 Cork Intermediate Football Championship (1): 1926
 Cork Junior B Hurling Championship Winners (1): 1996  Runners-Up 1989 1994
 Cork Junior B Football Championship Runners-Up 1984, 1991
 Cork Minor Hurling Championship: Runners-Up 1955, 1983 
 North Cork Premier Minor Football Winners (1) 1978
 North Cork Premier Minor Hurling Winners (1) 1983
 North Cork Premier Minor hurling Winners (1) 1984.
 Cork Minor B Hurling Championship: Runners-Up 2004
 North Cork  Minor A Football Champions: Winners (2) 2013, 2015
 North Cork Junior A Hurling Championship: Winners (1)  2010
 North Cork Junior A Football Championship: Winners (1) 2017 Runners-Up 2013 
 Cork County Minor A Football Championship: Winners (1): 2015  Runners-Up 2013

Notable players
 Batt Thornhill

References

External links
 Buttevant GAA site 

Gaelic games clubs in County Cork
Hurling clubs in County Cork
Gaelic football clubs in County Cork